European route E 19 (E 19) is a north–south European route, running from Amsterdam in the Netherlands to Paris in France.

The highway is maintained by Rijkswaterstaat.

Route description

History

Exit list

See also

References

External links

019
Motorways in North Brabant
Motorways in North Holland
Motorways in South Holland
Transport in Amsterdam
Transport in Breda
Transport in Dordrecht
Transport in Moerdijk
Transport in Rotterdam
Transport in The Hague
Delft
Leiden